William Morris Leiserson (1883–1957) was a labor relations scholar and mediator.

Leiserson was a professor, state and federal government administrator, mediator, arbitrator, and a member of President Franklin D. Roosevelt’s "brain trust," which developed and wrote legislation such as the Railway Labor Act of 1934.

Biography
Born in 1883, in Reval, Tsarist Russia (in an area later to become the nation of Estonia), William Morris Leiserson came to the United States at the age of seven with his mother and two brothers. As a student at the University of Wisconsin, he studied under Professor John R. Commons, whose life and work inspired Leiserson to pursue the fields of economics and labor relations. After graduation, he continued at Columbia University where he earned his Ph.D. under Henry Rogers Seager in 1911.

Leiserson then began a career as a research scholar, professor, and public administrator that was marked by four decades of high level service in an era of profound economic, political, and cultural change. Shortly after receiving his Ph.D., he returned to Wisconsin where he originated the State Employment Service. Returning to academia, he held professorships at the University of Toledo and Antioch College. His U.S. government service included Chief of the Labor Administration Division of the United States Department of Labor, Secretary of the National Labor Board of the National Recovery Administration (NRA) and member of the National Labor Relations Board (NLRB). The NLRB was the administrative arm of the Wagner Act, seminal legislation that guaranteed the right of workers to bargain collectively.

Leiserson's favorite government position was chairman of the National Mediation Board. This organization became the U.S. government's administrative arm for implementing the Railway Labor Act, which Leiserson was instrumental in writing for the U.S. Congress. The Act later was amended to include the airline industry. This, also seminal, legislation provided thorough, and effective procedures (carefully not requiring lawyers) for solving labor-management disputes among transportation workers and industries providing essential services to the U.S. economy. To this day the legislation provides a prototype for resolving disputes that involve essential services.

Most of the foregoing positions were appointments by President Franklin D. Roosevelt, during the Great Depression of the 1930s and World War II. After leaving government service, he retired and returned to research and teaching at Johns Hopkins University. Leiserson died in 1957 at the age of 74.

While he devoted much scholarly and research effort to increasing the government's awareness of the status and needs of the wage earner, Leiserson understood well the role of the mediator and the art of balancing the interests of labor and management in industrial disputes. Leiserson was awarded the honorary degree of Doctor of Laws by Oberlin College, June 24, 1947.

References

1883 births
1957 deaths
20th-century American economists
University of Wisconsin–Madison alumni
Columbia University alumni
Emigrants from the Russian Empire to the United States
Labor economists